
Gmina Słopnice is a rural gmina (administrative district) in Limanowa County, Lesser Poland Voivodeship, in southern Poland.

Neighbouring gminas
Gmina Słopnice is bordered by the town of Limanowa and by the gminas of Dobra, Kamienica, Limanowa and Tymbark.

References
Polish official population figures 2006

Slopnice
Limanowa County